Minuscule 911 (in the Gregory-Aland numbering), O29 (von Soden), is a 12th-century Greek minuscule manuscript of the New Testament with a commentary on parchment.

Description 

The codex contains the text of the Book of Acts, Pauline epistles, Catholic epistles, and Book of Revelation, on 334 parchment leaves (size ). It has lacuna in 1 John-Jude.

It contains a commentary, which is written in catena.

The texts of Acts 14:2-17:22; 2 Cor 5:13-6:6; 8:22-9:6; Col 1:1-6 were supplied by a later hand in the 15th century.

Text 
The Greek text of the codex is a representative of the Byzantine text-type. Kurt Aland made a textual profile for it (Acts 731 291/2 22 1s; Cath 451 51/2 12 1s; Paul 1961 481/2 32 0s). On the basis of this profile Aland placed it in Category V.

History 

According to Scrivener the manuscript was written in the 11th century, according to C. R. Gregory it was written in the 12th century. Currently the manuscript is dated by the INTF to the 12th century.

Formerly it was held in the Karakalou monastery at Athos peninsula. It was bought by Robert Curzon in 1837. C. R. Gregory saw it in 1883.

The manuscript was added to the list of New Testament manuscripts by Scrivener (217a, 235p) and Gregory (227a, 282p). In 1908 Gregory gave the number 911 to it.

The part of the manuscript with the text of the Apocalypse was described and its text was collated by Scrivener. Herman C. Hoskier collated its text again.

Formerly minuscule 2040 was classified as a separate manuscript. Currently it is included in Minuscule 911.

It is currently housed in the British Library (Additional Manuscripts) in London. 318 folios with the text of the Acts and Epistles are housed at Add MS 39599; 16 folios with the text of the Apocalypse are at Add MS 39601.

See also 

 List of New Testament minuscules
 Minuscule 910
 Biblical manuscript
 Textual criticism

References

Further reading 

 
  (as g)

External links 
 

Greek New Testament minuscules
12th-century biblical manuscripts
British Library additional manuscripts